Year 506 (DVI) was a common year starting on Sunday (link will display the full calendar) of the Julian calendar. At the time, it was known as the Year of the Consulship of Messala and Dagalaiphus (or, less frequently, year 1259 Ab urbe condita). The denomination 506 for this year has been used since the early medieval period, when the Anno Domini calendar era became the prevalent method in Europe for naming years.

Events 
 By place 

 Byzantine Empire 
 November – Emperor Anastasius I accepts a peace agreement with the Sasanian Empire (Persia), based on the status quo. He upgrades the fortifications at Batnae, Edessa and Amida (Northern Mesopotamia).

 Europe 
 February 2 – King Alaric II issues the "Lex Romana Visigothorum" or Breviary of Alaric, an abstract of Roman laws and imperial decrees, compiled by a commission appointed to provide a law code for Alaric's Roman subjects. The "Lex Romana" will be the standard for justice in the Visigothic realm.
 The Visigoths capture the city of Dertosa in Catalonia. They arrest and execute the Roman usurper Peter, with his head being sent as a trophy to Saragossa (Spain).

 By topic 

 Religion 
 September 10 – Council of Agde: The bishops of Visigothic Gaul under the presidency of Caesarius of Arles meet. 
 Antipope Laurentius is persuaded by Theoderic the Great to resign his claim to the throne of Pope Symmachus, ending a schism in the Catholic Church; Laurentius then fasts until his death.

Births 
 Sanghapala, Mon-Khmer monk (d. 518)
 Soga no Iname, leader of the Soga clan (d. 570)
 Wei Shou, Chinese author (d. 572)
 Zhang Yao'er, empress of Chen Dynasty China (d. 570)

Deaths 
 Buretsu, emperor of Japan
 Peter, Roman usurper in Spain

References